FC Systema-Boreks Borodianka was a Ukrainian football club of Bordianka excavation equipment factory from Borodianka, Kyiv Oblast. The club was dissolved in 2003 and temporarily merged with FC Borysfen Boryspil.

With the help of the Kyiv Oblast Football Federation, its place was handed to another club FC Boyarka-2006. Borodianka and Boyarka clubs have no direct connection and conditionally assumed as related by the Football Federation of Ukraine.

The Borodianka club itself has a long history of participation in the Ukrainian KFK competitions among "collectives of physical cultures" (so called amateur teams). The Borodianka team was sponsored by a local heavy equipment manufacturer Boreks (Borodianka) as well as the Ministry of Education sports club. The name Boreks is a portmanteau of Borodianka and excavator.

History
In 1992 the club originally was known as Hart Borodianka, based on the Central Sports Club "Hart" of Ministry of Education, competed at the Amateur level and were champions in the 3rd Zone of the Ukrainian KFK competition. The next season they entered the semi-professional Ukrainian Transitional League.

In 1994 Ukrainian Transitional League was reorganized as the Third League and before the 1994–95 season the club renamed themselves to Systema-Boreks Borodianka for which they were better known while they competed in the professional leagues. With reasonable success the club spent two seasons in the Ukrainian First League. In 2003 the club was de facto dissolved and became a farm team of FC Borysfen Boryspil carrying the name of Boreks-Borysfen Borodianka.

FC Osvita
Before the 2004–05 season the club was reformed and replaced with Osvita Borodianka becoming a base professional team for the All-Ukrainian Football Association of Students. In 2005 the club was struggling financially and eventually folded during the 2005–06 season. In 2006 it was replaced in championship with another club from Boyarka, Boyarka-2006.

Honours
Ukrainian Second League
Winners (1): 2001-02
Runners-up (1): 2000-01
Ukrainian Football Amateur League (also as Ukrainian KFK competitions)
Winners (1): 1992-93
Runners-up (1): 1983
Ukrainian Amateur Cup
Winners (1): 1986 (as Mashynobudivnyk)

League and cup history

Soviet Union
{|class="wikitable"
|-bgcolor="#efefef"
! Season
! Div.
! Pos.
! Pl.
! W
! D
! L
! GS
! GA
! P
!Domestic Cup
!colspan=2|Europe
!Notes
|-
|align=center|1985
|align=center rowspan=7|4th
|align=center colspan=12|no participation
|-
|-
|align=center|1986
|align=center bgcolor=tan|3
|align=center|16
|align=center|8
|align=center|4
|align=center|4
|align=center|33
|align=center|16
|align=center|20
|align=center|
|align=center|
|align=center|
|align=center|
|-
|align=center|1987
|align=center colspan=12|no participation
|-
|align=center|1988
|align=center bgcolor=tan|3
|align=center|22
|align=center|16
|align=center|1
|align=center|5
|align=center|52
|align=center|20
|align=center|33
|align=center|
|align=center|
|align=center|
|align=center|
|-
|align=center|1989
|align=center|4
|align=center|24
|align=center|11
|align=center|7
|align=center|6
|align=center|32
|align=center|32
|align=center|29
|align=center|
|align=center|
|align=center|
|align=center|
|-
|align=center|1990
|align=center|12
|align=center|30
|align=center|9
|align=center|6
|align=center|15
|align=center|27
|align=center|45
|align=center|24
|align=center|
|align=center|
|align=center|
|align=center|
|-
|align=center|1991
|align=center|12
|align=center|
|align=center|
|align=center|
|align=center|
|align=center|
|align=center|
|align=center|
|align=center|
|align=center|
|align=center|
|align=center|
|}

Ukraine
{|class="wikitable"
|-bgcolor="#efefef"
! Season
! Div.
! Pos.
! Pl.
! W
! D
! L
! GS
! GA
! P
!Domestic Cup
!colspan=2|Europe
!Notes
|-
|align=center|1992–93
|align=center|4th
|align=center bgcolor=gold|1
|align=center|26
|align=center|19
|align=center|4
|align=center|3
|align=center|58
|align=center|16
|align=center|42
|align=center|
|align=center|
|align=center|
|align=center  bgcolor=green|Promoted – as Hart Borodianka
|-
|align=center|1993–94
|align=center|3rd (lower)
|align=center|5
|align=center|34
|align=center|18
|align=center|11
|align=center|5
|align=center|52
|align=center|16
|align=center|47
|align=center|Did not enter
|align=center|
|align=center|
|align=center|
|-
|align=center|1994–95
|align=center|3rd (lower)
|align=center|6
|align=center|42
|align=center|23
|align=center|6
|align=center|13
|align=center|61
|align=center|31
|align=center|75
|align=center|1/16 finals
|align=center|
|align=center|
|align=center bgcolor=green|Promoted
|-
|align=center|1995–96
|align=center rowspan=5|3rd "A"
|align=center|9
|align=center|40
|align=center|17
|align=center|12
|align=center|11
|align=center|34
|align=center|31
|align=center|63
|align=center|1/128 finals
|align=center|
|align=center|
|align=center|
|-
|align=center|1996–97
|align=center|8
|align=center|30
|align=center|11
|align=center|8
|align=center|11
|align=center|28
|align=center|31
|align=center|41
|align=center|1/64 finals
|align=center|
|align=center|
|align=center|
|-
|align=center|1997–98
|align=center|9
|align=center|34
|align=center|12
|align=center|13
|align=center|9
|align=center|34
|align=center|23
|align=center|49
|align=center|1/128 finals
|align=center|
|align=center|
|align=center|
|-
|align=center|1998–99
|align=center|7
|align=center|28
|align=center|13
|align=center|7
|align=center|8
|align=center|22
|align=center|20
|align=center|46
|align=center|1/64 finals
|align=center|
|align=center|
|align=center|
|-
|align=center|1999-00
|align=center|5
|align=center|30
|align=center|12
|align=center|11
|align=center|7
|align=center|32
|align=center|17
|align=center|47
|align=center|1/8 finals Second League Cup
|align=center|
|align=center|
|align=center|
|-
|align=center|2000–01
|align=center rowspan=2|3rd "B"
|align=center bgcolor=silver|2
|align=center|28
|align=center|18
|align=center|8
|align=center|2
|align=center|46
|align=center|15
|align=center|62
|align=center|1/8 finals Second League Cup
|align=center|
|align=center|
|align=center|
|-
|align=center|2001–02
|align=center bgcolor=gold|1
|align=center|34
|align=center|20
|align=center|8
|align=center|6
|align=center|53
|align=center|23
|align=center|68
|align=center|1st Round
|align=center|
|align=center|
|align=center bgcolor=green|Promoted
|-
|align=center|2002–03
|align=center rowspan=2|2nd
|align=center|15
|align=center|34
|align=center|9
|align=center|13
|align=center|12
|align=center|28
|align=center|28
|align=center|40
|align=center|1/32 finals
|align=center|
|align=center|
|align=center|
|-
|align=center|2003–04
|align=center|17
|align=center|34
|align=center|8
|align=center|5
|align=center|21
|align=center|29
|align=center|52
|align=center|29
|align=center|1/32 finals
|align=center|
|align=center|
|align=center bgcolor=red|Renamed — Relegated
|-
|align=center|2004–05
|align=center rowspan=2|3rd "A"
|align=center|7
|align=center|28
|align=center|12
|align=center|10
|align=center|6
|align=center|34
|align=center|22
|align=center|46
|align=center|1/32 finals
|align=center|
|align=center|
|align=center|as Osvita Borodianka
|-
|2005–06
|colspan=12|initially moved to Kyiv, the club was replaced with Boyarka-2006 in mid-season
|}

Managers
FC Mashynobudivnyk
 Viktor Zhylin (1980–1981)
 Viktor Zhylin (1985–1986)
FC Systema-Boreks
 Viktor Zhylin (1993 – Jun, 1995)
 Viktor Pobehayev (Jul, 1995 – Nov, 1996)
 Vadym Lazorenko (1996 – 1997)
 Viktor Zhylin (Jan, 1997 – Nov, 2002)
FC Boreks-Borysfen
 Oleksandr Tomakh (Jan, 2003 – Nov, 2003)
 Stepan Matviyiv (Jan, 2004 – Jun, 2004)
 FC Osvita
 Pavlo Matviychenko (Jul, 2004 – Jun, 2005)
 Yuriy Moroz (Jul, 2005 – Nov, 2005)

See also
 FC Inter Boyarka
 FC Borysfen Boryspil

References

External links
 Valerko, A. Ukrainian wonders (Украинские диковинки). Football.ua. 9 January 2014
 Valerko, A. The PFL legends: "Systema-Boreks" Borodianka, 2001-02 season (Легенди ПФЛ: "Система-Борекс" (Бородянка), сезон 2001/2002). Footboom. 6 April 2016
 Yaroslav Smilianskyi. The changing room at trolley bus, stadium as a public construction. How lived football teams in the Soviet period? (Роздягальня в тролейбусі, стадіон – народна будова. Як жили футбольні команди в радянські часи?)''. Sport Arena. 22 December 2019

 
Defunct football clubs in Ukraine
Football clubs in Kyiv Oblast
Football clubs in Kyiv
FC Borysfen Boryspil
2003 disestablishments in Ukraine
Association football clubs disestablished in 2003
Sports team relocations